The 1930 Southwestern Lynx football team was an American football team that represented Southwestern Presbyterian University (now known as Rhodes College) as a member of the Southern Intercollegiate Athletic Association (SIAA) in the 1930 college football season. Led by Webb Burke in his second season as head coach, the Lynx compiled an overall record of 6–3 and with a mark of 1–2 in conference play.

Schedule

References

Southwestern
Rhodes Lynx football seasons
Southwestern Lynx football